Hallandstrafiken AB is the local transit authority in Halland, Sweden (with the exception of Kungsbacka, where Västtrafik is responsible for public transportation). Their main office is located in Falkenberg.

Traffic

Buses 
Hallandstrafiken is responsible for regional traffic in Halland except Kungsbacka, as well as city buses in Halmstad, Falkenberg and Varberg.

Trains 
Halland has commuter trains on three different lines, although none are procured by Hallandstrafiken, or run under their brand. These trains are the Øresundståg on the West Coast Line (Gothenburg-Copenhagen), procured by Skånetrafiken with support from Hallandstrafiken, Västtågen on Viskadalsbanan (Varberg-Borås) procured by Tåg i Väst, as well as Krösatågen procured by Jönköpings Länstrafik on the Halmstad-Nässjö railway line. Hallandstrafiken is responsible for selling tickets on all three of these trains within Halland.

External links

Falkenberg
Swedish companies established in 1983
Transport companies established in 1983
Public transport authorities of Sweden